Project 1153 Orel ( pr: "Or'yol", Eagle) was a late-1970s plan to give the Soviet Navy a true blue water aviation capability. The aircraft carrier would have about 72,000 tons displacement, with a nuclear power plant and about 70 aircraft launched via steam catapults, similar to the earlier Kitty Hawk-class supercarriers of the U.S. Navy. Unlike them and the preceding Soviet aircraft cruisers, it was also designed with a large offensive capability; the ship mounts including 24 vertical launch tubes for anti-ship cruise missiles. In the USSR it was classified as the "large cruiser with aircraft armament". The project 1153 (itself based on an early-1970s Project 1160, confusingly also named Orel, even 10,000 tonnes heavier) was cancelled in October 1978 as being too expensive, and a smaller Project 1143.5, more V/STOL-aircraft-oriented, was developed instead: in its initial stage, a version of 65,000 tons and 52 aircraft was proposed, but the actual Kuznetsov-class aircraft carriers are even smaller, about 55,000 tons. While the Project Orel never saw fruition, in the 1980s it influenced the also abortive Ulyanovsk program. 

The project was codenamed Eagle (Орёл), just like the two earlier helicopter and aircraft cruiser projects, and several projects of other classes of ships, were named after birds of prey. However the carriers themselves were named after Soviet cities, while only frigates were named after birds (see Russian ship naming conventions); the actual projected name of the ships is not known.

See also
List of ships of the Soviet Navy
List of ships of Russia by project number

References

External links 
 "Project 1143.7 Orel Ul'yanovsk class," GlobalSecurity.org.
 "A Brief Look at Russian Aircraft Carrier Development," Robin J. Lee.

Aircraft carriers of the Soviet Navy
Cold War aircraft carriers of the Soviet Union
Proposed aircraft carriers
Abandoned military projects of the Soviet Union